The International Surrealist Exhibition was held from 11 June to 4 July 1936 at the New Burlington Galleries, near Savile Row in London's Mayfair, England.

Organisers
The exhibition was organised by committees from England, France, Belgium, Scandinavia and Spain.

The English organising committee consisted of:

 Hugh Sykes Davies
 David Gascoyne
 Humphrey Jennings
 McKnight Kauffer

 Rupert Lee, Chairman
 Diana Brinton Lee, Secretary
 Henry Moore

 Paul Nash
 Roland Penrose, Honorary Treasurer
 Herbert Read

The French organising committee were:

 André Breton
 Paul Éluard
 Georges Hugnet
 Man Ray

The remaining nations had a single committee representative:
 E. L. T. Mesens, Belgium
 Vilhelm Bjerke-Petersen, Denmark
 Salvador Dalí, Spain
The number of exhibits, paintings, sculpture, objects and drawings displayed during the exhibition's run was around 390.

Danish painter Wilhelm Freddie's entries never made it to the exhibition, as they were confiscated by British Customs representatives for being pornographic. According to ruling law at the time, the works had to be destroyed, but this was avoided at the last minute and they were despatched back to Denmark.

Exhibitors
The following artists participated in the exhibition:

 Eileen Agar
 Hans Arp
 Jacqueline B. (Jacqueline Lamba Breton)
 John Banting
 Hans Bellmer
 John Selby Bigge
 Constanin Brancusi
 Victor Brauner
 Edward Burra
 Alexander Calder
 Giorgio de Chirico
 Cecil Collins
 Salvador Dalí
 P. Norman Dawson
 Oscar Dominguez
 Marcel Duchamp
 Max Ernst
 Mervyn Evans
 Leonor Fini
 Freddie
 
 David Gascoyne
 Alberto Giacometti
 S. W. Hayter
 Charles Howard
 Marcel Jean
 Humphrey Jennings
 Rita Kernn-Larsen
 Paul Klee
 Rupert Lee
 Len Lye
 Dora Maar
 René Magritte
 Maruja Mallo
 André Masson
 Robert Medley
 Reuben Mednikoff
 E. L. T. Mesens
 Joan Miró
 Henry Moore
 Stellan Mörner
 Paul Nash

 Richard Oelze
 Erik Olson
 Meret Oppenheim
 Wolfgang Paalen
 G. W. Pailthorpe
 Roland Penrose
 Francis Picabia
 Pablo Picasso
 Angel Planells
 Man Ray
 Pierre Sanders
 Max Servais
 Styrsky
 Graham Sutherland
 Yves Tanguy
 S. H. Tauber-arp
 Julian Trevelyan
 Toyen

The following individuals exhibited objects:

 André Breton
 Gala Dalí
 Claude Cahun
 Hugh Sykes Davies
 Rouge Dragon

 Eric Neville Geijer
 Geoffrey Grigson
 Diana Brinton Lee
 Sheila Legge

 Margaret Nash
 Herbert Read
 Roger Roughton
 Jean Varda

The following nations were represented at the exhibition:

 America
 Austria
 Belgium
 Czecho-Slovakia
 Denmark

 France
 Germany
 Great Britain
 Greece
 Italy

 Roumania
 Spain
 Sweden
 Switzerland

Exhibition Programming
The exhibition was officially opened in the presence of about two thousand people by André Breton. The average attendance for the entire run of the Exhibition was about a thousand people per day.

Over the course of the Exhibition, the following lectures were delivered to large audiences:

 16 June — André Breton — Limites non-frontières du Surréalisme.
 19 June — Herbert Read — Art and the Unconscious.
 24 June — Paul Éluard — La Poésie surréaliste.
 26 June — Hugh Sykes Davies — Biology and Surrealism.
 1 July — Salvador Dalí — Fantômes paranoïaques authentiques.

The most iconic image of the exhibition is the opening day performance of Sheila Legge, who stood in the middle of Trafalgar Square, posing in a white, drop tail hemmed wedding dress ensemble inspired by a Salvador Dalí painting, with her head completely obscured by a flower arrangement.  In one variation of the images capturing her performance, pigeons are perched on her outstretched, gloved arms.

Dalí's lecture was delivered whilst wearing a deep-sea diving suit. Nearly suffocating during the presentation, Dalí had to be rescued by the young poet David Gascoyne, who arrived with a spanner to release him from the diving helmet. During the exhibition, Welsh poet Dylan Thomas carried around a cup of boiled string, asking visitors would they rather it "weak or strong?"

The exhibition's catalog (and guide) was printed by the Women's Printing Society, a British publishing house dedicated to employing women.

References

Sources 

International Surrealist Bulletin, Number 4, September 1936

Art exhibitions in London
English art
Surrealism
1936 in London
French art
1930s in the City of Westminster
1936 in art